James Head may refer to:

James Head (director), Canadian filmmaker
James Head (fighter) (born 1984), American mixed martial artist
James Marshall Head (1855–1930), mayor of Nashville, Tennessee
James B. Head (1846–1902), Justice of the Alabama Supreme Court
James W. Head, American professor and engineer